"The Zephyr Song" is a song by American rock band Red Hot Chili Peppers, released as the second single released from their eighth studio album, By the Way (2002), on August 17, 2002. The song, as a single, was released in two parts. Both editions held two previously unheard-of B-sides, making it, collectively, hold four non-LP tracks. The single peaked at number six on the US Billboard Modern Rock chart, breaking the band's streak of three straight number-one hits.

Composition
The song is about nature's healing power and human connection. In April 2017, it was revealed that John Frusciante unintentionally interpolated the song "Pure Imagination" from the 1971 film Willy Wonka and the Chocolate Factory. The song's opening three guitar notes are the same as the first three sung notes from "Pure Imagination."

Music video
The music video, which was released on Sept 30,2002  was directed by Jonathan Dayton and Valerie Faris. The couple previously collaborated with the band on other videos and would continue to work with the band through the middle of the 2000s. It is generally reminiscent of a kaleidoscope, by utilizing circular and intertwining figures to achieve the psychedelic feel the band was aiming for. Kiedis would later say of the video:

The music video also features Flea's partner at the time, Tobey Torres.

Track listings

Personnel
Red Hot Chili Peppers
 John Frusciante – guitar, backing vocals, keyboards
 Flea – bass
 Anthony Kiedis – lead vocals, double-tracked lead vocals (chorus)
 Chad Smith – drums, drum machine

Charts

Weekly charts

Year-end charts

Certifications

Release history

References

Red Hot Chili Peppers songs
2002 singles
2002 songs
Music videos directed by Jonathan Dayton and Valerie Faris
Song recordings produced by Rick Rubin
Songs written by Anthony Kiedis
Songs written by Chad Smith
Songs written by Flea (musician)
Songs written by John Frusciante
Warner Records singles